Arius manillensis is a species of marine catfish endemic to the island of Luzon, Philippines. It is commonly known as the Manila sea catfish or kanduli. It is fished commercially.

Taxonomy and nomenclature
Arius manillensis was first described by the French zoologist Achille Valenciennes in 1840. It belongs to the genus Arius of the subfamily Ariinae, family Ariidae (ariid or fork-tailed catfishes).

It should not be confused with the closely related Cephalocassis manillensis, also described by Valenciennes in 1840.

Other common names of the species include kandule, dupit, kiti-kiti, tabangongo, and tauti.

Description

Distribution and habitat
Arius manillensis is endemic to the island of Luzon, Philippines. It is found in the area around Manila, Bataan, Laguna, Cavite, and Rizal; including the Pasig River and Laguna de Bay. It inhabits marine, brackish, freshwater, and benthopelagic habitats.

Biology
Arius manillensis are mouthbrooders. The males of the species incubate the eggs within their mouths for six to eight weeks and provide shelter for the young once they hatch. A single instance of a female carrying eggs in her mouth has also been reported. Upon  hatching, the young forage for plankton in short bursts but will quickly return to the safety of the mouth of the adult if alarmed. During the entire period, the adults do not eat and their stomachs shrink dramatically.

References

manillensis
Fish of the Philippines
Endemic fauna of the Philippines
Fauna of Luzon
Taxa named by Achille Valenciennes 
Fish described in 1840